The Late Report was a short-lived news satire show on Australia's Seven Network during 1999. Hosted by Richard Stubbs, the show also featured John Safran and Tony Wilson. It appeared at 10.30 on Tuesdays before being merged with The Big News.

Seven Network original programming
1999 Australian television series debuts
1999 Australian television series endings